is a Japanese politician. He is the vice governor of Okinawa Prefecture and took over the  governorship for a few days.

See also 
 Takeshi Onaga
 Relocation of Marine Corps Air Station Futenma

References 

1957 births
Living people
20th-century Japanese politicians
21st-century Japanese politicians
People from Okinawa Island
Governors of Okinawa Prefecture
Ryukyuan people
Japanese politicians of Ryukyuan descent